The 2018 Maine Black Bears football team represented the University of Maine in the 2018 NCAA Division I FCS football season. They played their home games at Alfond Stadium. They were a member of the Colonial Athletic Association. They were led by third-year head coach Joe Harasymiak. They finished the season 10–4, 7–1 in CAA play to be crowned CAA champions. They received the CAA's automatic bid to the FCS Playoffs where, after a first round bye, they defeated Jacksonville State in the second round, and Weber State in the quarterfinals before losing in the semifinals to Eastern Washington.

Previous season
The Black Bears finished the 2017 season 4–6, 3–5 in CAA play to finish in a three-way tie for seventh place.

Preseason

CAA Poll
In the CAA preseason poll released on July 24, 2018, the Black Bears were predicted to finish in eighth place.

Preseason All-CAA Team
The Black Bears had three players selected to the preseason all-CAA team.

Defense

Kayon Whitaker – DL

Special teams

Earnest Edwards – KR

Mozai Nelson – Specialist

Schedule

 Source:

Game summaries

New Hampshire

at Western Kentucky

at Central Michigan

at Yale

Villanova

at Rhode Island

at William & Mary

Albany

at Towson

at Richmond

Elon

FCS Playoffs
Maine received a bye in the first round.
Box scores:

Jacksonville State–Second Round

at Weber State–Quarterfinals

at Eastern Washington–Semifinals

Ranking movements

References

Maine
Maine Black Bears football seasons
Colonial Athletic Association football champion seasons
Maine
Maine Black Bears football